Sara Pennypacker (born 1951) is a New York Times bestselling American author of children's literature. She has written seventeen children's books, including Pax, Pax Journey Home, Here in the Real World, Summer of the Gypsy Moths, the Clementine, the Waylon series, and Stuart series.

Critical reception 

Pax was one of ten books making the longlist for the National Book Award for Young People's Literature in 2016. It was on The New York Times bestseller list for 54 weeks, reaching #1.

She received a Christopher Award for Clementine's Letter and the Golden Kite Award for Pierre In Love. She received Boston Globe and Horn Book awards for Clementine.

Clementine, Clementine and the Family Meeting, Clementine's Letter, The Talented Clementine, Stuart Goes to School, Pax, Summer of the Gypsy Moths, and The Mount Rushmore Calamity received starred reviews from Kirkus Reviews. Summer of the Gypsy Moths, Clementine, Pax, Dumbstuck and Here in the Real World received starred reviews from Publishers Weekly. Pax, Meet the Dullards, and Summer of the Gypsy Moths received starred reviews from School Library Journal.

Works

Pax Journey Home  (Balzer + Bray/HarperCollins, 2021). Illustrated by Jon Klassen.
Pax (Balzer + Bray/HarperCollins, 2016). Illustrated by Jon Klassen.
 Here in the Real World (Balzer + Bray/HarperCollins, 2020)
 Summer of the Gypsy Moths (Balzer + Bray/HarperCollins, 2012)
Dumbstruck (Holiday House, 1994). Illustrated by Mary Jane Auch.

Waylon books

 Waylon! One Awesome Thing (Disney-Hyperion, 2016)
 Waylon! Even More Awesome (Disney-Hyperion, 2018)
 Waylon! The Most Awesome of All (Disney-Hyperion, 2019)

Clementine books 
Illustrated by Marla Frazee

Clementine (Hyperion, 2006)
The Talented Clementine (Hyperion, 2007)
Clementine's Letter (Hyperion, 2008)
Clementine, Friend of the Week (Disney-Hyperion, 2010)
Clementine and the Family Meeting (Disney-Hyperion, 2011)
Clementine and the Spring Trip (Disney-Hyperion, 2013)
Completely Clementine (Disney-Hyperion, 2015)

Stuart books

 Stuart's Cape (Scholastic, 2002)
 Stuart Goes to School (Orchard/Scholastic, 2005)

Flat Stanley books

 The Mount Rushmore Calamity (HarperCollins, 2009)
 The Great Egyptian Grave Robbery (HarperCollins, 2009)
 The Japanese Ninja Surprise  (HarperCollins, 2009)
 The Intrepid Canadian Expedition (HaroerCollins, 2009)

Picture books

 Meet the Dullards (Balzer + Bray/HarperCollins, 2015)
 Sparrow Girl (Hyperion, 2009). Illustrated by Yoko Tanaka
 Pierre in Love (Orchard/Scholastic, 2007). Illustrated by Petra Mathers.

References

External links
 
Interview with School Library Journal
Interview with The Horn Book
Interview with National Public Radio
 
 Sara Young at LC Authorities, with one catalog record

1951 births
Living people
American children's writers
American women children's writers
21st-century American women writers